Thomas Benet may refer to:
 Thomas Bennet (academic) or Benet, British academic and administrator at the University of Oxford. 
 Thomas Benet (martyr) (died 1531), English Protestant martyr

See also
 Thomas Bennett (disambiguation)